Allomicythus is a monotypic genus of Southeast Asian ground spiders containing the single species, Allomicythus kamurai. It was first described by H. Ono in 2009, and has only been found in Vietnam.

References

Gnaphosidae
Monotypic Araneomorphae genera
Spiders of Asia